Timochares is a genus of skippers in the family Hesperiidae.

Species
Timochares runia Evans, 1953
Timochares ruptifasciatus (Plötz, 1884)
Timochares trifasciata (Hewitson, 1868)

References
Natural History Museum Lepidoptera genus database
Timochares at funet

Erynnini
Hesperiidae genera
Taxa named by Frederick DuCane Godman
Taxa named by Osbert Salvin